Nelson Stoll is an American sound engineer. He has been nominated for two Academy Awards in the category Best Sound. He has worked on over 60 films since 1970.

Selected filmography
 Dune (1984)
 Total Recall (1990)

References

External links

Year of birth missing (living people)
Living people
American audio engineers
Emmy Award winners